Heliothis quilengesi is a species of moth of the family Noctuidae first described by P. R. Seymour in 1972. It is found in Africa, including South Africa and Angola.

External links
 
Original description: Seymour, P. R. (1972). Bulletin of the British Museum (Natural History): 74.

Heliothis
Insects of Namibia
Insects of Angola
Moths of Africa
Moths described in 1972